= 5/9 =

5/9 may refer to:

- May 9 (month-day date notation)
- September 5 (day-month date notation)
